Linzhang County is a county of far southern Hebei province, China, named after the Zhang River within its borders.

Administrative divisions
There are 5 towns and 9 townships under the county's administration. The area was formerly part of Henan Province.

Towns:
Linzhang, Nandongfang, Suntaoji, Liuyuan, Chenggouji

Townships:
Diqiu Township, Zhangcunji Township, Xiyanggao Township, Xiangcaiying Township, Ducunji Township, Zhangliji Township, Xiwen Township, Zhuanzhaiying Township, Baiheji Township

Climate

References

County-level divisions of Hebei
Handan